The Rockaway Hunting Club is a country club and sporting venue established in 1878 in Cedarhurst, New York (now Lawrence). In 1893 the original clubhouse was lost in a fire. In 1917 the golf course was expanded from 9 holes to 18 holes.

References

External links

1878 establishments in New York (state)
Golf clubs and courses in New York (state)
Sports clubs established in 1878